Pterostylis atrosanguinea, commonly known as the crowded banded greenhood, is a plant in the orchid family Orchidaceae and is endemic to the south-west of Western Australia. The plants either have a rosette of leaves in the years when not flowering or stem leaves on a flowering spike. When flowering, it has up to twenty flowers that are dark reddish to blackish brown with translucent white areas. The labellum is dark reddish black and covered with short, stiff hairs.

Description
Pterostylis atrosanguinea, is a terrestrial,  perennial, deciduous, herb with an underground tuber. The dorsal sepal and petals form a hood over the column. Flowering occurs from late May to early August.

Taxonomy and naming
The crowded banded greenhood was first formally described in 2017 by David Jones and Christopher French and given the name Urochilus atrosanguineus. The description was published in Australian Orchid Review from a specimen collected near Waroona. In 2018 the same authors changed the name to Pterostylis atrosanguinea "to allow for the different taxonomic views held at generic level within the subtribe". It had previously been known as Pterostylis sp. 'crowded'. The specific epithet (atrosanguinea) is derived from the Latin word ater meaning 'dark' and sanguineus meaning 'red' referring to the colour of the flowers of this orchid.

Distribution and habitat
Pterostylis atrosanguinea occurs between Wongan Hills and Katanning where it grows in forest and woodland.

References

atrosanguinea
Endemic orchids of Australia
Orchids of Western Australia
Plants described in 2017